Mahamaya Girls’ College is a public girls' school in Kandy, Sri Lanka. Located in the centre of Kandy, overlooking the Kandy Lake, the school is named after Queen Mahamaya, the mother of Prince Siddhartha, the Buddha.

History

Mahamaya Girls’ College Kandy was founded in 1932 by the Sadhachara Kulangana Samithiya led by Lady Sarah Soysa and Chitravo Ratwatte. National leaders like Anagarika Dharmapala, D. B. Jayatilaka, P. de S. Kularatne, G. P. Malalasekera and C. W. W. Kannangara contributed to the college.

Chronology of notable events
 14 January 1932 - Mahamaya Girls' College was founded under the name "Buddhist Girls' College" with sixteen registered students.
 1938 - renamed as Mahamaya Girls' College.
 December 1960 - Mahamaya was taken over for State Administration.
 1982 - Mahamaya received the National School status.
 1990 - auditorium was completed.
 2000 - swimming pool was completed.

Principals

 Hilda Kularathne (1932-1933)
 A. Bangaru (1933-1937) (acting)
 B. I. Ratwatte (née Rogers) (1937-1949)
 C. Nanayakkara / S. Wijesundara (1949-1951) (acting)
 Soma Gunawardene (1951-1972)
 Lalitha Fernando (1972-1980)
 Dorathi Perera (1980-1981)
 N. K. Pilapitiya (1981-1990)
 M. Subasinghe (1990-1995)
 R. W. I. K. Rathnayake (1995-2000)
 W. M. B. Wijesinghe (2000-2005)
 I. Withanaarachchi (2005-2017)
 Himali Senadheera (2018-2020) (acting)
 Lalitha Egodawela (2020)
 Dulani Samarakoon (2020-2021) (acting)
 Shashikala Senadheera (2021-present)

College today
There are around 4500 students, 185 female teachers and 15 male teachers. Therevada Buddhism is an integral part of the school's education system, as it is in all Sri Lankan Buddhist public schools. Students are divided among four houses. The housing system is primarily used for sporting events and house debates.

Education

Mahamaya Girls' College is divided into a primary section and a secondary school section. The primary school which consists of grades 1 through 5 is located near the secondary school. The primary school looks over the Kandy Lake. The secondary school consists of grades 6 through 13. Each grade has seven classes, and each class consists of around forty students.

The school has facilities for science, commerce, mathematics, languages and biology A/L schemes. It produces nationally high-ranking students, evidenced by the all-island positions received by students who sit for the national Ordinary Level and Advanced Level examinations. It has been ranked in the top three over the years among all the girls' schools in Sri Lanka in the preference rankings based on year 5 scholarship examinees' demand.

Sports and extracurricular activities

The school has a number of nationally ranking student-athletes, who are involved in sports ranging from track and field to swimming. In addition to partaking in many national sporting events, the school holds an annual sports-meet, which is an intra-school competition.

The school has a Western music band, an Eastern music band, a Western music choir and a traditional Sri Lankan dance team. The award-winning Literary, Music and Drama Society of the school takes part in national drama competitions. The first Observational Astronomy Competition in South Asia was organised by the Anandian Astronomical Association of Ananda College, Colombo together with the Astronomical Society of Mahamaya Girls’ College.

Song and flag

The school flag, crest and the school song in Sinhala were introduced during the tenure of Soma Pujitha Gunewardena. The first school song in English was introduced by Bertha Rogers Ratwatte.

Houses
The students are divided into four Houses:

 –  Sangamiththa
 – Maya
 –  Yasodhara
 –  Prajapathi

The house names are derived from Buddhist history. The houses compete in inter-house games and competitions as well as the college sports-meet held in the month of January every year.

Notable alumnae

References

External links
Colours Awards at Mahamaya Girls College, Kandy 
Colombo Branch of the Past Pupils’ Association of Mahamaya Girls’ College 
Mahamaya Girls' College Alumnae Association of North America
Mahamaya Alumnae Association Sydney  
'Maya Puwath' Mahamaya Alumni newsletter 
Mahamaya Girls' college Kandy 

National schools in Sri Lanka
Buddhist schools in Sri Lanka
Schools in Kandy
Girls' schools in Sri Lanka
Educational institutions established in 1932
1932 establishments in Ceylon